The 2006 Bucknell Bison football team was an American football team that represented Bucknell University during the 2006 NCAA Division I FCS football season. Bucknell tied for fourth in the Patriot League. 

In their fourth season under head coach Tim Landis, the  Bison compiled a 6–5 record. Stefan Niemczyk and Dorian Petersen were the team captains.

The Bison were outscored 268 to 222. Their 3–3 conference record tied with Colgate for fourth place in the seven-team Patriot League standings. 

Bucknell played its home games at Christy Mathewson–Memorial Stadium on the university campus in Lewisburg, Pennsylvania.

Schedule

References

Bucknell
Bucknell Bison football seasons
Bucknell Bison football